Allium henryi is a plant species native to Hubei and Sichuan, China. It grows on hillsides at elevations of 1300–2300 m.

Allium henryi has a clump of cylindrical bulbs, each up to 12 mm across. Scape is up to 25 cm tall. Leaves are flat, narrow, long than the scape. Umbels have a few blue flowers.

References

henryi
Onions
Flora of China
Flora of Hubei
Flora of Sichuan
Plants described in 1895